Storvorde is a small town to the east of Aalborg in Denmark with a population of 3,425 (1 January 2022).

Notable people 
 Anders Gravers Pedersen (born 13 May 1960) is a Danish anti-Islam activist, lives in Storvorde.

References

Cities and towns in the North Jutland Region
Towns and settlements in Aalborg Municipality